The 14th Vanier Cup was played on November 18, 1978, at Varsity Stadium in Toronto, Ontario, and decided the CIAU football champion for the 1978 season. The Queen's Golden Gaels won their second championship by defeating the UBC Thunderbirds by a score of 16-3.

References

External links
 Official website

Vanier Cup
Vanier Cup
Vanier Cup
November 1978 sports events in Canada